The Men's Boxing Tournament at the 1955 Pan American Games was held in Mexico City, Mexico, from March 12 to March 26, with the inclusion of two new weight divisions (Light Welterweight and Light Middleweight) to the existing eight.

Medal winners

Medal table

References 
 Amateur Boxing: 1955 Pan American Games
 
 
  .

Boxing at the Pan American Games
Events at the 1955 Pan American Games
Pan American Games